Zahida Malik (born 26 February), better known as Veena Malik, is a Pakistani actress, TV host, reality television personality and model who has appeared in Pakistani and Bollywood films. Veena made her film debut in 2000 with Sajjad Gul's Tere Pyar Mein. In 2002, she starred in Akbar Khan's Yeh Dil Aap Ka Huwa and Sassi Punno and later played roles in female-centric films such as Koi Tujh Sa Kahan (2005), Mohabbatan Sachiyan (2007), Kyun Tum Se Itna Pyar Hai (2005), Kabhi Pyar Na Karna (2008) and Ishq Beparwaah (2008). In 2012, she was seen in Bollywood with a comedy film, Daal Mein Kuch Kaala Hai. The following year, she appeared in the comedy-drama Zindagi 50-50, Supermodel and the Kannada film Dirty Picture: Silk Sakkath Maga. She also appeared in 2014 horror film Mumbai 125 KM 3D. She was a contestant on Bigg Boss in 2010.

Early life
Veena was born as Zahida Malik on 26 February in Rawalpindi, Punjab, Pakistan, in a Punjabi family to Malik Mohammad Aslam and his wife, Zeenat Malik.

Career

Television
In 2002, Veena hosted the Prime TV series, Prime Gupshup for them ushering a new direction for her comic skills and she improvised on the hour-long show occasionally mimicking actors.

Veena hosted the Geo TV show Hum Sub Umeed Se Hain, in which she was hailed for her comedic parodies.
In 2007, she appeared at the Lux Style Awards and was awarded as being the Most stylish celebrity on the carpet.

In October 2010, Veena appeared in the Indian television reality show Bigg Boss Season 4.

She was evicted two weeks before the finals, and was one of the final six contestants out of the original fourteen who had participated. Veena was also part of the finale of the show. After her Bigg Boss stay, she was mentioned in the media as the voice of liberal Muslims, including leading dailies, Daily Times, Express Tribune, and The Australian. Sabbah Hajim, from the Haji Amina Charity Trust in Jammu and Kashmir, writing in the magazine Tehelka, when comparing her with liberal rector of Darul Uloom Deoband said, "these two newly public figures might teach Muslims to stop feeling eternally outraged."

In February 2011, Veena became part of the Cricket World Cup reality show in Delhi, India, called "Big Toss." Big Toss was a reality game show with contestants and Veena as the captain of one team, against Rakhi Sawant and her team.

In March 2011, Veena engaged in a passionate debate with a mufti, who claimed she had engaged in immoral behaviour as a contestant on Bigg Boss, even though he admitted to not having watched the show. Veena countered pointing out the double standards of Pakistani media against women among other rebuttals.

Another show Veena Malik – Veena Ka Vivah was planned where Veena would search for her soul-mate, but the show was cancelled when Imagine TV, the channel on which the show was being shown, announced that it was shutting down. Veena collected almost 71,000 entries from all over the world for the show.

Films
Before starting as an actress, Veena was a comedian for several television shows and series. She made her acting debut alongside Shaan and Zara Sheikh in Askari's Tere Pyar Mein (2000), which was a box office hit. She played a supporting role in the film and was barely acknowledged. Later on, she appeared in a supporting role in Javed Sheikh's Yeh Dil Aap Ka Huwa (2002).

In 2003, Veena appeared in Indo-Pak cross venture Punjabi film Pind Di Kudi which failed commercially, however, it was the first Indo-Pak venture film with a budget of approximately 70 million rupees. She also appeared in Askari's Sassi Punno (2003) alongside Sana and Moammar Rana, however the film failed to do well at Lahore's cinemas and further screenings stopped in cinemas after a week of its release. She then appeared in Rafique's Jageer. In 2005, she appeared in a short Punjabi film Bau Badmash (2005) which also failed to garner recognition. Her breakthrough role was in Reema Khan's Koi Tujh Sa Kahan which was a commercial success in Pakistan. In the same year, she played the parallel lead role of Farwa in fantasy film Naag aur Nagin.

In 2008, Veena appeared in Rafique's Punjabi film, Mohabbatan Sachiyan, alongside ex-fiancée Babrik Shah and newcomers Maria Khan and Adnan Khan. The film went on to become a commercial success. The same year, she appeared in Raza's Kabhi Pyar Na Karna in a supporting role, but the film was a flop. Her last film of 2008 was Altaf's Ishq Beparwah, which also failed to impress the audience. In 2010, she worked in Rafique's Main Jeena Tere Naal, and Beyg's debut comedy film Miss Duniya.

In 2012, Veena debuted in Bollywood with an item song in Gali Gali Mein Chor Hai entitled "Chhanno" which was a big hit. Then in the same month she did another item song "Fann Ban Gayi" in Tere Naal Love Ho Gaya. Then she made her acting debut with a comedy Daal Mein Kuch Kaala Hai. The film didn't do well at the box office but Malik's performance was widely acclaimed. In 2013, her first film was Rajiv S. Ruia's social drama Zindagi 50 50 in which she played a prostitute. She appeared in the music video "Ac Chala Garmi Badi Hai" sung by Sukhdeep Grewal. Then she made a special appearance in Punjabi film, Jatts in Golmaal in an item song "Shabboo". She then made her Kannada film debut and appeared in Dirty Picture: Silk Sakkath Hot in which she portrayed the life of actress Silk Smitha for which she gained 5 kg. The film was a success. Her last film of 2013 was Super Model. Veena played a supermodel, a small town girl who becomes a success in the fashion industry. Her last Bollywood film was Hemant Madhukar's Mumbai 125 KM 3D that was released on 17 October 2014.

Personal life 
Veena married businessman Asad Bashir Khan Khattak on 25 December 2013 in Dubai. Malik is Muslim and has stated that she has visited the Kaaba three times.

Philanthropy 
Veena has worked as a representative at the World Health Organization for two years. She also sponsors a child at the SOS Children's Village, an NGO based in Pakistan working with orphaned children.

In the media
Veena broke the Guinness World Records for getting maximum kisses on her birthday in a span of one minute beating Salman Khan who held the record achieved on the reality show Guinness World Records – Ab India Todega.

In 2012 she was ranked at No. 26 on FHM Indias "100 sexiest women list" which included Angelina Jolie, Megan Fox, Paris Hilton, Kim Kardashian, Shilpa Shetty and Sonam Kapoor.

Controversy

FHM images 
Controversy resulted in Pakistan over a nude image of Veena on the cover of FHM magazine India edition in which she had "ISI" written on her upper arm – the initials of Pakistan's Inter-Services Intelligence spy agency. Veena says she was topless but did not pose completely nude, and has sued the magazine over the images.

Legal troubles
In November 2014, Veena and her husband Asad were sentenced to 26 years in prison by a Gilgit court for allegedly airing a blasphemous programme. The owner of Pakistan's biggest media group, Geo TV and Jang group, was accused of allowing the airing of the blasphemous programme by Geo television in May, which played a religious song while staging a mock marriage of Veena with Bashir. The judge sentenced Veena and Bashir and TV host Shaista Wahidi to 26 years each. She planned to appeal. They have yet to serve any time, as the ruling is not enforceable outside Gilgit.

Filmography

Television

Reality television
As Contestant

Drama serials 
 Achanak PTV
 Kaun Psycho Thriller Appeared in EP 7 STN

Discography
As lead artist

As featured artist

See also 
 List of Pakistani actresses

References

Bibliography 

 Stardom in Contemporary Hindi Cinema: Celebrity and Fame in Globalized Times. Germany, Ed. Aysha Iqbal Viswamohan, Clare M. Wilkinson, Springer Singapore, 2020.  
 Fatima Aziz,  Microcelebrity Around the Globe  Publication date: 19 November 2018  
 Televisual Pakistan  First Published  16 June 2020 Volume: 10 issue: 2, page(s): 105-110 ; Issue published: 1 December 2019 Ravi Vasudevan,  Rosie Thomas,  S. V. Srinivas,  Kartik Nair,  Debashree Mukherjee,  Lotte Hoek,  Salma Siddique

External links

 

Living people
Actresses from Lahore
Actresses in Urdu cinema
Actresses in Hindi cinema
Actresses in Kannada cinema
Actresses in Telugu cinema
Bigg Boss (Hindi TV series) contestants
Nigar Award winners
Pakistani film actresses
Pakistani television actresses
Female models from Punjab, Pakistan
Pakistani expatriate actresses in India
Pakistani expatriates in the United Arab Emirates
Pakistani Muslims
People from Rawalpindi
Actresses from Rawalpindi
Punjabi people
People prosecuted for blasphemy
Year of birth missing (living people)
21st-century Pakistani actresses